Shamshiri may refer to:
 Shamshiri, Bushehr
 Shamshiri, Kerman